Nationality words link to articles with information on the nation's poetry or literature (for instance, Irish or France).

Events
February 27 – A few days before his death from consumption at his rectory in Bemerton (near Salisbury in England), George Herbert calls for a lute so that he can sing religious songs. He has sent his poems, none of which have been published in his lifetime, to Nicholas Ferrar of the Little Gidding community and they are issued later in the year.

Works published

Great Britain
 Abraham Cowley, Poetical Blossomes
 John Donne, Poems, by J.D.: With elegies on the authors death, the first collected edition of the author's works; (seven editions by 1669) including "The Canonization" and the Holy Sonnets
 Phineas Fletcher, The Purple Island; or, The Isle of Man
 George Herbert, The Temple: Sacred poems and private ejaculations, a posthumous collection of all Herbert's poems, including "Easter Wings" (shown at right); edited by Nicholas Ferrar
 Thomas May, The Reigne of King Henry the Second
 Wye Saltonstall, translator, Tristia, from the original Latin of Ovid

Other
 Luis de Góngora y Argote, edited by Don Gonzalo de Hoces y Cordoba, Todas las obras de don Louis de Gongora en varios poemas, a posthumous edition of Gongora's works often used as a source for later publications in the following centuries; Spain
 François L'Hermite, who wrote under the pen name "Tristan L'Hermite", Les Plaintes d’Acanthe, France

Births
Death years link to the corresponding "[year] in poetry" article:
 Wentworth Dillon, 4th Earl of Roscommon (died 1685), English poet
 George Savile, 1st Marquess of Halifax (died 1695), English statesman, writer, and politician

Deaths
Birth years link to the corresponding "[year] in poetry" article:
 March 1 – George Herbert (born 1593), Welsh-born poet, orator and priest
 August 10 – Anthony Munday (born 1560), English dramatist and miscellaneous writer
 Edmund Bolton (born 1575), English historian and poet
 Hortensio Félix Paravicino (born 1580), Spanish preacher and poet
 Ye Wanwan died this year, according to one source, or in 1632, according to another (born 1610), Chinese poet and daughter of poet Shen Yixiu; also sister of women poets Ye Xiaowan and Ye Xiaoluan

See also

 17th century in literature
 17th century in poetry
 Poetry

Notes

17th-century poetry
Poetry